The Presidential Security Group, shortened as PSG, is a Philippine close protection agency. It is the primary agency concerned with providing close-in security and escort to the President of the Phillppines, their immediate families, former presidents of the Philippines as well as visiting heads of state.

The PSG is stationed at Malacañang Palace, the official residence of the president. Members of the PSG also accompany the president on both domestic and overseas trips.

History
While the present-day force was established in 1987, the protection of the president and the presidential family has always been the duty of the Armed Forces of the Philippines since 1897. A guard unit was raised at the time to protect the first official president, Emilio Aguinaldo, from attempts on his life, In 1898, a presidential cavalry squadron was raised for the protection of President Aguinaldo and his family, reinforced with a guards infantry company. Like today's PSG, they wore rayadillo uniforms, but with straw hats. Major Geronimo Gatmaitan was the unit commander.

In 1936, the 1st Cavalry Regiment of the 1st Infantry Division, Philippine Army, raised the same year, was tasked with defending President Manuel Quezon, his family, and the palace complex. They were joined by a guards company in 1938 to reinforce the President's security.

During the Second World War, units of the occupying Imperial Japanese Army initially took over guard duties at the palace, only to be replaced by an all-Filipino guard battalion at the insistence of President José P. Laurel. At war's end, it was in turn replaced by the AFP Presidential Guards Battalion under the orders of President Sergio Osmeña. The PSG of today traces its origins to 1950 when a presidential security unit was founded under the orders of President Elpidio Quirino as the secret service and protective unit of the state presidency, the First Family, and Malacañang Palace, under the control of the Philippine Constabulary (then the Secret Service of  Malacañang Palace and later the Presidential Security Force and Presidential Security Agency and Presidential Security Command).

When President Corazon Aquino was sworn in as president, she gave the order to disband the PSC and replace with the PSG. The PSG, then as in the present, has always included both civilian agents and seconded servicemen from the Armed Forces.

The PSG launched the PSG Troopers website on February 10, 2017, as part of an effort to improve public relations. Information concerning the president's security arrangements are considered as classified.

Four PSG officers were wounded in an encounter with New People's Army guerillas in Arakan, North Cotabato after they were spotted running a fake vehicle checkpoint.

On September 26, 2017, a PSG officer was found dead inside the Malacañang complex with a gunshot wound to the chest.

Role 
The role of the PSG is tasked with:

 Providing security to:
 The president and their immediate family.
 The vice president and their immediate family.
 The president-elect and their immediate family.
 The vice president-elect and their immediate family.
 Former presidents and their immediate families.
 Former vice presidents and their immediate families.
 Visiting heads of states or diplomats and Cabinet members and their families travelling with them.
 Providing escort security for them at all times.
 Securing the president and vice president's residences, offices and places of engagements.
 Surveillance and monitoring activities.
 Performing state protocol duties including honor guard duties

The Presidential Security Group also have other functions, such as providing support to other government agencies. They assist the AFP and PNP in its anti-organized-crime undertakings, usually authorized by the Office of the President. They also conduct community service efforts in local communities, and maintain and secure all facilities and transportation assets used by the offices of the president and vice president in doing its regular and non-regular functions.

Organization 

The following are organized under the PSG as of 2010:

Leadership 
 Commander-in-Chief: President Bongbong Marcos
 Secretary of National Defense: Ret. Gen. Carlito Galvez Jr., AFP
 Commander, Presidential Security Group: BGen. Ramon P. Zagala, PA

Key Personnel 

 Commander, either a Colonel or Brigadier General
 Chief of Staff
 Special Reaction Unit Commander
 Commanding Officers
 Headquarters and Headquarters Service Battalion
 Security Battalion
 Presidential Escorts Battalion
 Presidential Guards Battalion

Units 

 Headquarters & Headquarters Service Battalion
Presidential Escorts - the actual personnel accompanying the President and Vice President
Guard Battalion
Security Battalion
Special Reaction Unit / K9 Unit
 PSG Station Hospital
 PSG Dental Dispensary
 Presidential Intelligence Company
 PSG Training School
 PSG Band

Recruitment 
Agents are usually personnel from the Armed Forces of the Philippines, Philippine National Police and Philippine Coast Guard.  However, there are a few civilian personnel acting as support units.

Military and police personnel serving in the PSG retain the ranks and insignia of their service which are worn in almost all orders of dress.

Equipment 

PSG members are known to carry assorted firearms, some known firearms include:

The PSG utilizes Motorola trunked two-way radios with encryption capability.

Vehicles 
The PSG currently uses a fleet of vehicles, ranging from motorcycles; armored modified sedans and mid-sized vehicles; and armored personnel carriers.

Notes

References

External links
 Official Site
 Old site of the Presidential Security Group (Archive)

Department of National Defense (Philippines)
Government agencies under the Office of the President of the Philippines
Protective security units
Malacañang Palace
Guards of honour
Government agencies established in 1897